Lim Kit Siang (born 20 February 1941) is a Malaysian politician. He was the longest-serving leader of the opposition in Malaysia, and held the position for a total of 29 years on three separate occasions. He was also former Secretary-General and National Chairman of the Democratic Action Party (DAP), which is a component party of the Pakatan Harapan  coalition.

Early life
Lim was born in Batu Pahat, Johor, British Malaya on 20 February 1941.

Political career

Member of Parliament
Lim first emerged as a politician when he was National Organising Secretary of the DAP from 1966 to 1969. At the same time he was also entrusted to edit the party's newspaper, the Rocket. The course of the political landscape changed when he was promoted to Secretary-General in 1969 after being acting Secretary-General for a short stint during a period.

Lim was first elected as an MP for the Bandar Melaka seat in 1969. His election was initially held to be void, however, because of the ineligibility of an election agent who had previously failed to discharge his duties from standing for election in the future. The Prime Minister of Malaysia, Tun Abdul Razak, moved a motion in Parliament to prevent Lim from serving as an MP, granting him instead a period of time to request a royal pardon from the Yang di-Pertuan Agong (King). After receiving the royal pardon, Lim was allowed to retain his seat.

Apart from 1999 to 2004, during which time he lost his seat due to the Chinese disenchantment with DAP entering into a political pact with the Islamist PAS for the general elections, Lim represented various constituencies in five states:
 Bandar Melaka, Melaka (1969–1974)
 Kota Melaka, Melaka (1974–1978)
 Petaling, Selangor (1978–1982)
 Kota Melaka, Melaka (1982–1986)
 Tanjong, Penang (1986–1999)
 Ipoh Timor, Perak (2004–2013)
 Gelang Patah, Johor (2013-2018)
 Iskandar Puteri, Johor (since 2018)

He also served as a state assemblyman in Melaka and Penang during the following periods: Kubu, Melaka (1974–1982); Kampong Kolam, Penang (1986–1990); and Padang Kota, Penang (1990–1995).

In addition, Lim had also served as the Opposition Leader of Malaysia three times over a span of 50 years. He was first elected Opposition Leader for an 18 month stint from January 1973 to July 1974. Next, he assumed the position in November 1975 for the next 24 years before losing his parliamentary seat in the 1999 general elections. He served in the post once more for a four-year stint following the 2004 general elections until 2008.

He led the party as Secretary-General until 1999 when he was elected party chairman, succeeding Chen Man Hin. In 2004, he refused re-appointment as the chairman and Karpal Singh was elected to replace him. Lim was then elected to an advisory role as the leader of a newly created body called the "Policy and Strategic Planning Commission". His son, Lim Guan Eng, was the Secretary-General of the party and the Finance Minister of Malaysia.

After winning a parliamentary seat from Ipoh Timor during the 2004 general election, which also saw his party clinching the most seats of any opposition party, Lim became the Parliamentary Opposition Leader.

Lim contested and won in Gelang Patah against Barisan Nasional's heavyweight and former Menteri Besar of Johor Abdul Ghani Othman in the 2013 general election.

Detention without trial
In 1969, Lim was detained lawfully under the Internal Security Act for 18 months. Ten years later, in 1979, he was convicted of five charges under Official Secrets Act for exposing an legitimate arms deal between the government and a Swiss company.

Retirement 
On 20 March 2022, on the 17th DAP National Congress, Lim announced his retirement and that he will not be contesting in the Central Executive Committee and the following general and state elections, citing old age. The Secretary-general of DAP, Anthony Loke had originally intended to appoint him as the mentor of the party. However, Lim declined the offer.

Controversy
In the March 2008 general election, he was re-elected as the Member of Parliament for Ipoh Timor with a majority of 21,942 votes. Lim issued an instruction for all DAP representatives to boycott from the swearing-in ceremony for Perak Menteri Besar, claiming that there was no DAP mandate for PAS Menteri Besar in Perak. This caused the Perak MB swearing-in ceremony to be cancelled and only took place after Lim apologised and retracted his instruction.

Personal life
He is married with 4 children. He is the father of Lim Guan Eng, currently National Chairman of the Democratic Action Party (DAP), and formerly served as Minister of Finance in the PH administration under former prime minister Mahathir Mohamad from May 2018 to the collapse of the PH administration in February 2020, and 4th Chief Minister of Penang from March 2008 to May 2018. Lim's daughter Lim Hui Ying is currently the MP of Tanjong, deputy Minister of Education, and formerly served as a senator.

Election results

Timeline

Books

Notes and references

Other references
 Pillai, M.G.G. (1 November 2005). "Did Lee Kuan Yew want Singapore ejected from Malaysia?". Malaysia Today.

External links
 Official website
 Official Website for DAP Malaysia

|-

|-

|-

|-

|-

1941 births
Living people
People from Batu Pahat
People from Johor
Malaysian people of Hokkien descent
Malaysian people of Chinese descent
Malaysian politicians of Chinese descent
20th-century Malaysian lawyers
Recipients of Malaysian royal pardons
Asian democratic socialists
Democratic Action Party (Malaysia) politicians
Malaysian Leaders of the Opposition
Members of the Dewan Rakyat
Members of the Malacca State Legislative Assembly
Members of the Penang State Legislative Assembly
Members of Lincoln's Inn
21st-century Malaysian politicians